Kalsindur Government Primary School is a government-funded primary school situated in Kalsindur village of Dhobaura Upazila in Mymensingh District, Bangladesh. Boys and girls ages at the range of 6-11 years old study there from class I-V.

Sports
The school has produced a number of women's footballers who represented Bangladesh from age group football to senior football at international levels.

Notable alumni
 Maria Manda
 Sheuli Azim
 Sanjida Akhter
 Tohura Khatun
  Shamsunnahar

References

 
Government Primary Schools in Bangladesh
Schools in Mymensingh District